Archips eleagnanus is a species of moth of the family Tortricidae first described by James Halliday McDunnough in 1923. It is found in North America, where it has been recorded from Alberta, Manitoba, Saskatchewan, Wyoming and New Mexico. The habitat consists of prairies and montane areas.

The wingspan is about 20 mm. The colour of the forewings varies from greyish olive to greyish red. The hindwings are grey. Adults are on wing from the end of June to early August.

The larvae feed on Eleagnus species.

References

Moths described in 1923
Archips
Moths of North America